Cosmas III served as Greek Patriarch of Alexandria between 1737 and 1746. Although he was only the patriarch for the Greeks in Egypt and Africa.

References

18th-century Greek Patriarchs of Alexandria